Ma Zhancang was a Hui Chinese Muslim general of the New 36th Division (National Revolutionary Army), who served under Generals Ma Zhongying and Ma Hushan. At the Battle of Kashgar (1933), he repulsed an attack of Uighurs led by the Syrian Arab Tawfiq Bay, wounding Tawfiq. He fought against Kirghiz and Uighur rebels and destroyed the First East Turkestan Republic after defeating Uighur and Kirghiz fighters at Kashgar, the Battle of Yarkand and the Battle of Yangi Hissar in 1934. He killed the Uighur leaders Timur Beg, Abdullah Bughra and Nur Ahmad Jan Bughra.

References

External links 
Flags of Independence

Hui people
Republic of China warlords from Gansu
Chinese Muslim generals
National Revolutionary Army generals from Gansu
1937 deaths
Xinjiang Wars
Year of birth missing